Contrasts is a jazz album by Bucky Pizzarelli and his son John Pizzarelli, released in 1999. The album features both an acoustic guitar and an electric 7 string guitar, a trademark of Bucky Pizzarelli.

Track listing
"Three Little Words" – 3:54
"Coquette" – 2:57
"Jersey Bounce" – 6:51
"The Bad and the Beautiful" – 2:27
"Three Minute Samba" – 2:38
"Contrasts" – 6:02
"Test Pilot" – 2:35
"I Hadn't Anyone Till You/The Very Thought of You" – 4:30
"The Devil and the Deep Blue Sea" – 5:37
"Two Funky People" – 6:38
"Stage Fright" – 2:54
"Phantasmagoria" – 4:47
"My Romance" – 1:47
"Emily" – 4:39
"Guess I'll Go Back Home This Summer" – 2:16
"For Whom the Bell Tolls" – 2:09

Personnel
Bucky Pizzarelliguitar
John Pizzarelliguitar

References

1999 albums
Bucky Pizzarelli albums
John Pizzarelli albums
Swing albums
Arbors Records albums
Collaborative albums